Daniel Scott (born 11 January 1953) is a Cuban basketball coach and former player. As a player, he competed in the men's tournament at the 1976 Summer Olympics and the 1980 Summer Olympics. He lives in Guanabo, Cuba as of November, 2022.

References

1953 births
Living people
Cuban basketball coaches
Cuban men's basketball players
Olympic basketball players of Cuba
Basketball players at the 1976 Summer Olympics
Basketball players at the 1980 Summer Olympics
People from Santa Cruz del Sur